The 1904 United States presidential election in West Virginia took place on November 8, 1904. All contemporary 45 states were part of the 1904 United States presidential election. West Virginia voters chose seven electors to the Electoral College, which selected the president and vice president.

West Virginia was won by the Republican nominees, incumbent President Theodore Roosevelt of New York and his running mate Charles W. Fairbanks of Indiana. Despite the 13 point victory in the state, it was 5 points more Democratic than the national average, making the state close by comparison to the national standard of margin .

Results

Results by county

Notes

References

West Virginia
1904
1904 West Virginia elections